Metro Racławicka is a station on Line M1 of the Warsaw Metro. It is located in the Mokotów district of Warsaw, at the junction of ulica Racławicka (Racławicka Street) and Aleja Niepodległości (Independence Avenue).

The station was opened on 7 April 1995 as part of the inaugural stretch of the Warsaw Metro, between Kabaty and Politechnika.

References

External links

Railway stations in Poland opened in 1995
Line 1 (Warsaw Metro) stations
Mokotów